Lalitbhai Mehta is an Indian politician. He was a Member of Parliament, representing Gujarat in the Rajya Sabha, the upper house of India's Parliament, representing the Bharatiya Janata Party.

References

Rajya Sabha members from Gujarat
1937 births
Living people
Bharatiya Janata Party politicians from Gujarat